Lowell Brockway Dana (February 26, 1891 – December 6, 1937) was an American football player and coach.  He served as the head football coach at the University of Cincinnati, serving from 1912 to 1913, and compiling a record of 8–7–2.  Dana died of a stroke on December 6, 1937, in Muskegon, Michigan.  He had worked with his father in the printing business in Muskegon for previous 20 years.

Head coaching record

References

External links
 

1891 births
1937 deaths
American football ends
Cincinnati Bearcats football coaches
Dartmouth Big Green football players
Sportspeople from Muskegon, Michigan
Coaches of American football from Michigan
Players of American football from Michigan